Anarsia centrospila is a moth of the  family Gelechiidae. It was described by Turner in 1919. It is found in Queensland.

The wingspan is about 15 mm. The forewings are grey-whitish, with some fuscous irroration along the costa and termen. There is a longitudinally-elongate dark-fuscous central discal spot. The hindwings are pale-grey, darker towards the apex.

References

centrospila
Moths described in 1919
Moths of Australia